The University of Peradeniya,  in Sri Lanka, is composed of nine undergraduate faculties of study. These faculties contain 79 departments in total. In addition, the university has two postgraduate institutions and six affiliated centres.

History

Under the pioneering work of Sir Ivor Jennings, University of Ceylon was established in 1942. At the beginning, it had only three present day faculties, namely; Faculty of Arts and Oriental Studies, Faculty of Medicine and Faculty of Science. A Faculty of Law also functioned separately. Since then, five other faculties have been added to the university at different times. Latest addition is the Faculty of Allied Health Science which was established in 2005. It drew much attention of the media as well as the professionals of health sector due to circumstances regarding its establishment. Department of Law operate within the faculty of Arts.

Faculties of Study

Faculty of Agriculture

A faculty of Agriculture was established in the University of Ceylon in-order to meet the requirements of manpower for research and development of the agricultural industry in Sri Lanka.  At the beginning, it functioned as the Faculty of Agriculture and Veterinary Science, together with departments of Animal Husbandry and Veterinary Science. It was only by 1973, it became a separate faculty in the University of Peradeniya. The faculty offers two undergraduate degree programs; B.Sc. in Agricultural Technology and Management and B.Sc. in Food Science and Technology. The first one is offered since 2006, replacing the traditional degree, B.Sc. in Agriculture and the latter one since 2004. Faculty of Agriculture has several sub campuses except the main campus located in Peradeniya. Agricultural Farm School is situated in Kundasale, Sri Lanka, 25 kilometers away from the faculty. Another sub campus is located in Mahailuppallama, in the North Central province of Sri Lanka. The faculty maintains two residential facilities for the students in the Mahailuppallama campus.

 Departments in the Faculty of Agriculture

Department of Agricultural Biology 
Department of Agricultural Economics and Business Management 
Department of Agricultural Engineering 
Department of Agricultural Extension 
Department of Animal Science 
Department of Crop Science 
Department of Food Science and Technology 
Department of Soil Science

Faculty of Arts

Consisting of 16 academic departments of study, several institutions and a museum, Faculty of Arts is considered to be the largest faculty in University of Peradeniya. It was established with the establishment of University of Ceylon in 1942. Initially, it functioned as faculties of Arts and Oriental Studies. It had seven departments; Classics, Economics, English, Geography, History, Oriental Languages, and Philosophy. The Department of Oriental Languages was divided in 1943 into the four separate departments of Sinhalese, Tamil, Pali and Sanskrit. Academic disciplines, Law and Arabic were added in 1945, Sociology, Education and Modern Languages in 1949, Archaeology in 1959 and Buddhist Philosophy in 1964. Latest additions are Fine Arts in 2001 and Management Studies in 2002. Student enrolment in the faculty is around 3000 at present.

 Departments in the Faculty of Arts

Department of Archaeology 
Department of Arabic & Islamic Civilization 
Department of Classical Language 
Department of Economics 
Department of English & French 
Department of Education 
Department of Fine Arts 
Department of Geography 
Department of History 
Department of Management 
Department of Pali & Buddhist Studies 
Department of Philosophy & Psychology 
Department of Political Science 
Department of Sinhala 
Department of Sociology 
Department of Tamil & Hindu 
The Department of Education conducts only postgraduate programs leading to a Diploma in Education, MA and M.Phil. degrees, while all other departments of study have both undergraduate and postgraduate degree programs

Faculty of Dental Sciences

The faculty of Dental Sciences was established as the Dental School of University of Ceylon in 1943. A part of the faculty was moved to Peradeniya in 1954. It became a department of the faculty of Medicine, University of Peradeniya with its establishment in Peradeniya, in 1961. In 1980, the Dental School was departmentalized into 5 departments, and in October 1986 it achieved Faculty status. Two other departments were added to the faculty in 1990 and 1997. Faculty underwent a massive change with the opening of new faculty building and Teaching Hospital on 12 June 1998.

 Departments of the Faculty of Dental Sciences

Department of Basic Sciences 
Division of Pharmacology 
Department Oral Surgery/Cleft Care 
Department of Oral Medicine & Periodontology 
Department of Prosthetic Dentistry 
Department of Microbiology 
Department of Radiology 
Department of Oral Pathology 
Department of Restorative Dentistry 
Department of Community Dental Health

Faculty of Engineering

Faculty of Engineering, University of Peradeniya is the oldest engineering faculty in Sri Lanka, established on 1 July 1950. It offers full-time Undergraduate Courses leading to the degree of Bachelor of Science in engineering (BSc.Eng.) and postgraduate degrees; Master of Science in Engineering (MSc.Eng.), Master of Philosophy (M.Phil.) and Doctor of Philosophy (Ph.D.). Faculty of Engineering is the host for the largest theatre in the university, E.O.E. Pereira memorial theatre.

 Departments of the Faculty of Engineering

Department of Chemical and Process Engineering 
Department of Civil Engineering 
Department of Computer Engineering 
Department of Electrical and Electronic Engineering 
Department of Engineering Mathematics 
Department of Mechanical Engineering 
Department of Production Engineering

Faculty of Medicine

Faculty of Medicine, University of Peradeniya is the second medical school in Sri Lanka, established in 1966.
 Departments of the Faculty of Medicine

Department of Anatomy 
Department of Surgery 
Department of Biochemistry 
Department of Paediatrics 
Department of Physiology 
Department of Obstetrics and Gynecology 
Department of Pharmacology 
Department of Psychiatry 
Department of Parasitology 
Department of Anaesthesiology 
Department of Microbiology 
Nuclear Medicine Unit 
Department of Pathology 
Department of Forensic Medicine 
Medical Education Unit 
Department of Community Medicine 
Department of Medicine

Faculty of Science

Faculty of Science was established in 1961. At the beginning it had only the departments of Botany, Chemistry, Mathematics, Physics and Zoology. Admission of the students to the first batch took place in the 1961/62 academic year. Prior to that, the faculty was located in Colombo. Faculty offers general and special Bachelor of Science (B.Sc.) Degrees and several postgraduate degrees.

 Departments of the Faculty of Science

Department of Botany 
Department of Chemistry 
Department of Geology 
Department of Mathematics 
Department of Molecular Biology and Bio-technology 
Department of Physics 
Department of Statistics and Computer Science 
Department of Zoology

Faculty of Veterinary Medicine and Animal Science 

Faculty of Veterinary Medicine and Animal Science was established in 1947, along with the faculty of Agriculture. Establishment of both faculties was approved by the Ministry of Education, on 5 April 1947. It was moved to Peradeniya in 1954. In 1973, the Department of Veterinary Science was upgraded to a School of Veterinary Science within a Faculty of Medical, Dental and Veterinary Sciences. By 1980, it received the full faculty status. Faculty was officially opened on 27 March 1980 with Professor S.T. Fernando as its first dean.

 Departments of the Faculty of Veterinary Medicine and Animal Science

Department of Basic Veterinary Sciences 
Department of Veterinary Pathobiology 
Department of Public Health & Pharmacology 
Department of Veterinary Clinical Sciences 
Department of Farm Animal Health and Production

Faculty of Allied Health Sciences

Faculty of Allied Health Sciences is the 1st new addition to the university in 55 years, after the establishment of Faculty of Engineering. But this has drawn much attention of the media as well as the professionals of health sector due to circumstances regarding its establishment. And the controversy has not yet been settled.

 Departments of the Faculty of Allied Health Sciences

Department of Medical Laboratory Science 
Department of Nursing 
Department of Physiotherapy 
Department of Pharmacy 
Department of Radiography/Radiotherapy

Post-graduate Institutes

University of Peradeniya has two postgraduate institutions.

Post-graduate Institute of Science 

Post-graduate Institute of Science (PGIS) is a national institute established by the Ministry of Higher Education, Sri Lanka in 1996.

Post-graduate Institute of Agriculture 

Post-graduate Institute of Agriculture (PGIA) was established in 1975. It offers four postgraduate degrees in total, namely, M.Sc., M.Phil., MBA and Ph.D. in agriculture. PGIA's Master of Business Administration (MBA) degree program was initiated in 1998 and is the first such Programme offered in Sri Lanka outside Colombo, and the third to be offered by a public university in the country.

Institutions in University of Peradeniya

Centre for the Study of Human Rights 
Internet and Communication Services Unit 
Information Technology Center 
Centre for Distance and Continuing Education 
Center for Environmental Studies

Institutions affiliated to the Faculty of Agriculture

Agricultural Biotechnology Centre (AgBC)  - This is the only Agricultural Biotechnology Centre of the country,
Agriculture Education Unit (AEU)  
Agribusiness Centre (AbC)

Senerath Paranavitana Teaching and Research Museum

Senerath Paranavitana Teaching and Research Museum is an affiliated institution to the Department of Archaeology, Faculty of Arts. It was established in 1960.

See also

University of Peradeniya
Campus of University of Peradeniya
List of University of Peradeniya people

References

External links 
Official Website of the University of Peradeniya
University Grants Commission of Sri Lanka
Official faculty websites
Faculty of Agriculture - University of Peradeniya
Faculty of Arts - University of Peradeniya
Faculty of Dental Sciences - University of Peradeniya
Faculty of Engineering - University of Peradeniya
Faculty of Medicine - University of Peradeniya
Faculty of Science - University of Peradeniya
Faculty of Veterinary Medicine and Animal Science - University of Peradeniya
Faculty of Allied Health Sciences - University of Peradeniya
Official post-graduate institution websites
Post-graduate Institute of Science
Post-graduate Institute of Agriculture